Meelis Pai (born on 9 February 1968 in Tartu) is an Estonian theatre leader and theatre producer and occasional actor.

In 1996 he graduated from Tallinn Pedagogical University in theatre management speciality.

From 2000 until 2013, he was the head of NUKU Theatre. Since 2015 he is the artistical leader of Salme Cultural Centre.

He has participated on several television series, including the roles of Kristjan Koorman in Wikmani poisid (1994) and Toomas in Kelgukoerad (2007).

In 2010 he was awarded with Order of the White Star, IV class.

References

Living people
1968 births
Estonian theatre directors
Estonian male television actors
20th-century Estonian male actors
21st-century Estonian male actors
Recipients of the Order of the White Star, 4th Class
Tallinn University alumni
People from Tartu